Eugene Smith may refer to:

Eugene Allen Smith (1841–1927), American geologist
Eugene Allison Smith (1922-1980), American politician and farmer
Eugene P. Smith (1871–1918), American sailor and Medal of Honor recipient
Victor Smith (English footballer) (Eugene Victor Charles Smith, 1878–1951), English footballer
W. Eugene Smith (1918–1978), American photojournalist
Eugene Smith (aviator) (1918–2012), American Tuskegee Airman and attorney
Eugene Smith (singer) (1921–2009), American gospel singer and composer
Eugene Owen Smith, American biographer
L. Eugene Smith, American politician, member of the Pennsylvania House of Representatives
Geno Smith (born 1990), American football quarterback

See also
Gene Smith (disambiguation)